Neil Fletcher may refer to:

 Neil Fletcher (politician) (born 1944), British politician
 Neil Fletcher (rugby union) (born  1976), British rugby union player